Racoș (also Racoșul de Jos;) is a commune in Brașov County, Transylvania, Romania. It is composed of two villages, Mateiaș (Mátéfalva) and Racoș. 

The commune is located at the northern edge of the county, on the border with Covasna County, and near the border with Harghita County. There are train stations in both Racoș and Mateiaș that serve Line 300 of the CFR network, which connects Bucharest with the Hungarian border near Oradea.

The Racoș volcano is the oldest volcano in the region, and appears to be inactive. The  nature preserve is partly situated on the territory of Racoș.

At the 2011 census, 55% of inhabitants were Hungarians, 23.2% Romanians and 21.6% Roma. At the 2002 census, 33.4% were Reformed, 23.3% Romanian Orthodox, 21% Pentecostal, 17.7% Unitarian, and 3.6% Roman Catholic.

The ruins of a Dacian fortress are located in Racoș. The  is a historic monument, first attested in 1636.

References

Communes in Brașov County
Localities in Transylvania